The Williamson County Courthouse Historic District is an historic district in Georgetown, Texas, listed on the National Register of Historic Places.

Buildings
The district includes the following buildings:

 Williamson County Courthouse
 Williamson County Jail
 M.B. Lockett Building
 117 W. 7th Street
 H. C. Craig Building
 Gold's Department Store
 103 W. 7th Street
 101 7th Street
 Georgetown Public Library
 103-107 E. 7th Street
 Masonic Temple
 703-705 Main
 707-709 Main
 Old Shafer Saddle Shop
 Evans Building
 715 Main
 Dimmitt Building
 P. H. Dimmitt Building
 P. H. Dimmitt & Co. (Old Dimmitt Hotel), 801 Main
 Old City Hall and Fire Station
 102 W. 8th Street
 104-106 W. 8th Street
 108-112 W. 8th Street
 116 W. 8th Street
 118 W. 8th Street
 120 W. 8th Street
 Gas Station
 812-824 Austin
 Palace Theatre
 802 Austin Street
 212-224 W. 8th Street
 215-223 W. 8th Street
 718 Austin Street
 Farmers State Bank
 714 Austin Street
 712 Austin Street
 Mileham Building
 706 Austin Street
 704 Austin Street
 702 Austin

See also
 Belford Historic District
 National Register of Historic Places listings in Williamson County, Texas

References

External links

 Williamson County Historical Commission

Geography of Williamson County, Texas
Georgetown, Texas
Historic districts on the National Register of Historic Places in Texas
National Register of Historic Places in Williamson County, Texas